Yellow Peppers (Hebrew: פלפלים צהובים; Pilpelim Tzehubim) is an Israeli drama television program about a family that raises an autistic child in a rural village lacking any therapeutic resources. The programme was well received by critics. It was also presented as a part to the World Autism Awareness Day at the United Nations.

Plot
Ayellet (Alma Zack) makes good money as the village tailor, and when her father, Meir (Yehuda Barkan), turns to agricultural politics, her husband, Yaniv, turns the family farm into a profitable business exporting yellow peppers. Both men help her raise Natty, her teenage daughter from a former marriage, and Omri, her toddler son from her present one. The few indications she has of Omri's developmental problem do not bother her because the village physician says everything is okay.

When Ayellet's brother, Avshy, returns to the village, it seems like a new opportunity: Avshy will replace Yaniv in the greenhouses, and Yaniv will build their new biker restaurant. However, Avshy's wife, Yaely, a physician, wants to give her marriage a second chance and comes with her husband to live on the farm. Yaely is concerned about Omri's symptoms. Meir drives the child to the closest town, where he is diagnosed as autistic.

Ayellet removes Omri from kindergarten, and the family organizes an intensive therapeutic homeschooling plan. Ayellet stops spending time with her daughter and stops working. No money is left for completing the restaurant. Ayellet fires her brother from managing the greenhouses, and he becomes depressed and leaves his wife. Yaniv stops participating the homeschooling.

Yaniv wants Ayellet to get pregnant again, but she refuses.

Yaniv fights with Ayellet about taking Omri to community events. Yaniv wants to take him to a party at the preschool, but Omri disappears. Yaniv forces Ayellet to tell the police and the village, who are searching for Omri, that he is autistic. The family explains to everyone that calling Omri by his name will not make him answer. When night falls, Omri is found in the preschool.

British version 
A British version, The A Word, began screening on the BBC in March/April 2016. As of 2020, there have been three series.

Greek version 
A Greek version, The Word You Don’t Say (Η λέξη που δεν λες) was produced in Greece in 2016.

Dutch version 
A Dutch version, Het A-woord, began screening by the Evangelische Omroep in September 2020.<ref>{{Cite web|url=https://over.eo.nl/pers/lies-visschedijk-hoofdrol-in-nieuwe-eo-feelgood-dramaserie-het-a-woord|title='Lies Visschedijk hoofdrol in nieuwe EO-feelgood-dramaserie 'Het A-Woord|website=Evangelische Omroep}}</ref>

 American version 
An American version, The A Word'' was in development at NBC and will be a co-production between Keshet Studios and Universal Television with Arika Lisanne Mittman as writer.

References

External links
 

Israeli drama television series
Serial drama television series
Autism in television
2010 Israeli television series debuts
2014 Israeli television series endings